Clifton  is an unincorporated community in Ashe County, North Carolina, United States, located east of Fig. It lies at an elevation of 2,769 feet (844 m).

References

Unincorporated communities in Ashe County, North Carolina
Unincorporated communities in North Carolina